Dayanand College, Hisar is a public funded UGC recognized college, previously affiliated to Kurukshetra University and now affiliated with Guru Jambheswar University Hisar, located in Hisar in the Indian state of Haryana. It is a conventional Degree college running all contemporary degree courses. The college is mainly famous for its Science stream.

History
On 1 June 1950, the college was founded at Hisar by the not-for-profit private trust, by the efforts of its first principal and notable Arya Samaji Lala Gian Chand Mahajan (who later became Swami Munishwaranand), under the umbrella of D.A.V. College Managing Committee (founded 1886) on 24 acres land, with 4 acres for the main campus and another 20 acres few hundred meters away for other facilities, such as hostels, staff quarters, sports ground and indoor sports complex. In 1951, the college qualified for and started to receive UGC grants and aid.

In 1997, the college won the award of best college by the Department of Higher Education, Haryana.

Between 2006 and 2012, the college won the Zonal Youth Festival Championship five times.

During last 26 years, the college has been University Yoga Champion for 23 years in the annual competitions.

In 2016, the National Assessment and Accreditation Council graded and accredited the college as A class institute.

Facilities
The college has 8625.76 sqm built-up area over 4 acres of the main campus and 12000.26 sqm built-up area for the hostels. The college also has 35 laboratories, library with 90000 books and 100 journals, computer center with 10 computers, wifi internet connection, 400 meters  athletics track, a cricket stadium, hockey ground, basketball court, multipurpose indoor sports complex, dispensary and health center, separate boys and girls hostels, separate residential quarters for 26 staff and cafeteria. Out of 159 permanent, temporary and casual teaching staff, a total of 37 have PhD qualifications.

Details 
The college offers the various undergraduate (BA, BSc, BCom, BCA and BBA) and post-graduate courses (MA, MCom, MSC and MCA) in arts, science, commerce, business, computer and electronics.

29 Undergraduate courses - three years full time courses with 43 subject combinations:

 Bachelor of Arts 
 Bachelor of Arts (honors) in English
 Bachelor of Commerce
 Bachelor of Science
 Bachelor of Business Administration
 Bachelor of Computer Application
 Bachelor of Mass Communication

6 Postgraduate courses - two years full time courses:

 Master of Arts
 Master of Commerce
 Master of Science (Geography)
 Master of Science (Mathematics)
 Master of Science (Biotechnology)

PhD and research courses - two years full time courses:
 College faculty is university approved centre for supervising the PhD and MPhil research and students.

Vocational courses, 3 month certificate,  month diploma and one year advanced diploma in the following:

 Diploma in Computer Maintenance and Networking, 60 seats
 Hardware and Networking of Computers, 40 Seats
 Internet and Web Designing, 40 Seats
 TV and VCR Repair, 40 Seats
 Retailing Management, 40 Seats

Notable alumni 
The college has produced several thousand notable politicians, achievers, sports person, businessmen. 
 Arvind Kejriwal, CM of Delhi
 Ajay Chautala, MP and MLA
 Kamal Gupta, MLA
 Prem Chand Gupta, RJD MP from Jharkhand
 Joginder Sharma, Indian national team cricketer and the captain of Haryana Cricket Team
 Karmveer Choudhary, actor

See also 
 List of Universities and Colleges in Hisar
 List of schools in Hisar
 List of institutions of higher education in Haryana

External links 
  Official website
 Google map

References 

Universities and colleges in Hisar (city)
Universities and colleges affiliated with the Arya Samaj